Eliseo Hernandez Moreno (September 27, 1959 – March 4, 1987) was an American spree killer who killed six people in the Houston region of Texas on October 11, 1983. Moreno shot and killed his wife, brother-in-law, a Texas Highway Patrol trooper, and three strangers before he was arrested. Moreno was found guilty of all six homicides and executed in 1987 for the murder of the police officer.

Events 
On October 11, 1983, Moreno was out searching for his estranged wife, Esther Garza, when he killed her and his brother-in-law, Juan Garza, in College Station before killing Texas Highway Patrol trooper Russell Boyd north of Hempstead. In Hempstead itself, Moreno murdered three elderly people and took a family hostage from whom he was brought to Pasadena. Officers at a Wharton County roadblock arrested Moreno while he was driving towards the Rio Grande Valley with another hostage.

Aftermath 
Moreno was sentenced to death in 1984 for the murder of Boyd. In October 1985, he was sentenced to 45 years imprisonment for the murders of Juan Garza and Esther Garza, and an additional 35 years imprisonment for the murders of James Bennatte, Allie Wilkins, and Ann Benatt. He pleaded guilty to all charges and refused any appeals. On March 4, 1987, after only three years on death row, Moreno was executed at the Huntsville Unit via lethal injection.

See also 
 Capital punishment in Texas
 Capital punishment in the United States
 List of people executed in Texas, 1982–1989
 List of rampage killers in the United States

References 

1959 births
1987 deaths
20th-century executions by Texas
People from Hidalgo County, Texas
People executed by Texas by lethal injection
American spree killers
Executed spree killers